Kadiyakurichy  is a village in the Srirangam taluk of Tiruchirappalli district in Tamil Nadu, India.

Demographics 

As per the 2001 census, kadiyakurichi had a population of 902 with 451 males and 451 females. The sex ratio was 1000.

References 

 

Villages in Tiruchirappalli district